Anania luctualis is a species of moth in the family Crambidae. It is found in France, Switzerland, Austria, Italy, Croatia, Bosnia and Herzegovina, Hungary, Slovakia, Romania, Poland, Belarus and Russia. In the east, the range extends to China and Japan.

The wingspan is about 25 mm.

References

External links
Lepiforum.de

Moths described in 1793
Pyraustinae
Moths of Asia
Moths of Europe